Idam (Tamil) (Sanskrit: इदम् or अयम् or इयम्) is a Tamil/Sanskrit word which denotes location or position or place. In grammar it is used at the beginning or middle of a sentence as a nominative or attributive pronoun, combined with or without ya, adds emphasis to other nouns, propositions etc.; and means - this, here or yonder, present or seen nearby, fit for, or without reference to noun refers to एतद् ('that') or to what precedes.

Overview

In the Bhagavad Gita (Sloka XVI.13), in the phrase – इदम् अस्तीदम् अपि मे the word, idam, has been used to mean 'this', "this it is, this also mine", and in the Brihadaranyaka Upanishad (Stanza I.i.10) in the phrase – पर्याप्तं त्विदम् एतेषां, meaning "sufficient though that of these", idam used as  एतद् refers to 'that', whereas (in Stanza. II.5.9) in the phrase – अयम् स्तनयित्नुः, meaning "Thunder is Vayu", ayam refers to 'is'. In the phrase – ब्रह्म इदम् सर्वं, which means - "Brahman possessing all the qualities is all-pervading", the word idam is used in the sense of 'it is', the Atman is identified with idam sarvam and the same phrase also expresses the whole world because the world springs from the Atman as is indicated in Stanza V.iii.1. In the Vedas, idam as ayam has been used as a subject in nominal sentences as an equivalent of a proposition.

Connotation

In Pada 32 of Book II Ch.IV of his Ashtadhyayi Pāṇini, who states that words apply per object, explains that: 
इदमोऽन्वादेशेऽशनुदात्त तृत्यादौ ||
in the room of idam 'this', in case of its re-employment in a subsequent member of the same sentence and referring to the same thing (anvadesha i.e. adesha after re-employment) there is the substitution of as’ which is a anudatta i.e. gravely accented, when the third case-affix and the rest follow. That means – अ replaces इदम् in all cases except the nominative and the accusative. In this context Katayayana stipulates that one should specify a pronominal used in subsequently referring to something should be co-referential with a previously used term because replacement by an anaphoric pronoun should not possibly be allowed where there is not co-reference.  And, with regard to taddhita affixation abstract patterns like tasya idam ('prescribing a genitive relationship'), tad asmin ('prescribing a locative relationship') and tat karoti ('prescribing an action meaning involving an accusative relationship') have been identified. The genitive form of idams is explained as a sthaneyoga sasthi (Pada I.i.49) and the locative form is explained as parasaptami  when a case ending beginning with the instrumental case endings follows. A substitute which has s’ as an it-letter replaces the whole of the original form which step requires an anubandha.

Kaiyata tells us that words with Krta and Tadditha affixes denoting bhava ('being') extended for bhava to mean dravya ('object') would result in dravya, a pronoun, referring to anything not specified i.e. to an individual object or locus.  According to Patanjali the verb as’ means - bhava or kriya. The term, Kriyadharma ('the properties of an action'), is also used in contrast with the terms dravyadharma and sattvadharma; and Helaraja states that which has the latter two is something that can be referred to by demonstratives such as idam ('this') and tad ('that').

In Pali language, Ida and Idam are accusative singular neuters as is the original etad or eghad. In Tamil literature idam refers to land, landscape or place, which word is one of the six forming the three sets of oppositions; idam pairs in opposition with kalam ('time') i.e. idavakupeyar that gives name to a place or to something in or from that place, and kalavakupeyar which applies the name of a time or season to something that occurs in time and season.

Minard (according to whose criteria repetition would imply an adverb and a declined form indicates a pronoun) considers idam in the phrase idam sarvam as an adverb but idam of the Shatapatha Brahmana ( Stanza 7.4.1.25) firstly implies the article and thereafter 'the All', the Absolute totality which removes the anti-thesis of ayam ('this') and asau ('yonder world').

Madhvacharya consistent with Samkhya philosophy and Sayana with Advaita Vedanta, take idam occurring in the first line – न वि जानामि यदिवेदमस्मि निण्यः संनध्दो मनसा चरामि in Mantra I.164.37 of the Rig Veda to mean 'the Universe' instead of its adverbial meaning "here", where the word samnaddho means ignorance rather than scepticism.

Vedic elucidation

The Bhagavad Gita's and the post-Vedic use of idam and tad refers to the Absolute or Brahman or "the All" i.e. to that which the Vedic sages sought to clarify. The idam occurring in the beginning of Rig Veda mantra X.135.7 refers to the seat of Yama where is heard the sound of Yama's flute which no mortal can resist.  Idam is the nominative singular neuter demonstrative pronouns, Being and Non-being the singular subject which is one without a second, in which condition it applies to anything falling within the range of human experience.

Advaita elucidation

According to Sankara, aham (I-sense secured in introspection, visayi) and idam (thou-sense sense secured in extrospection, visaya) are polarly related, they are as opposed as light and darkness. Idam Brahman refers to etadakshara - Brahman as the objective unity and the tadakshara – Brahman refers to the subject, the Atman i.e. Brahman as Itself, which cannot be an object matter of pramana-jnana since the Atman is non-dual and does not have the knowing and the known in it. Reality is to be cognized objectively as an idam as the goal by looking inwards otherwise the vidhi-vakyas would serve no purpose. Beyond "I" is not any person knower or doer but the transcendental ground of "I", the unspeakable; the indeterminate cannot be spoken about directly. Sankara condemns avidya or Adhyasa, the wrong apprehension of a content where it is not nor can ever be, which the true knowledge of idam or Brahman alone can eradicate. The idam aspect of ahamkara reflected by the light of the pure self becomes the object of the "I-sense". Brahman cannot be known in the objective attitude as an object somewhere in the beyond as an idam. Advaita Vedanta holds Brahman as the Atman and Brahman as idam sarvam ("all this").

Yoga and Shaivite elucidation

The Yoga school of Hindu philosophy considers the Individual Self inseparable from and identical with the Universal Self. Shiva represents the supreme consciousness Brahman; the subject (consciousness) which is the positive Shiva-tattva is called aham and the object ('power of consciousness') which is the negative Shakti-tattva is called idam('this'), the former which pervades the thirty-five tattvas  being passive is dependent on Shakti (idam) for creation to occur. The three principal modes of Shakti are iccha-shakti ('will power'), jnana-shakti ('power of knowledge') and kriya-shakti ('power of action'). Sadashiva-tattva, which is the first thing with a cause, identified with iccha-shakti consists of both aham, and idam,  Ishvara-tattva identified with jnana-shakti accounts for aham recognizing idam, and Sadvidya-tattva identified with kriya-shakti is the complete "subject-object unity". In Cit-shakti, Ananda-shakti, Iccha-shakti, Jnana-shakti and Kriya-shakti the svatantraya of Shiva is reflected. Shakti-tattva too is a reflection of Shiva-shakti. The four tattvas are not created by the energies of Shiva but are an expression or ushma ("heat") of His true nature. Suddhavidya is the real state of Shiva or the state of aham aham-idam ida, Ishvara which is the state of idam-aham, Sadashiva is the state of aham-idam and Shakti is the state of aham. In the first section of aham aham-idam idam, aham aham signifies the stable state associated with one's cognition of the real nature of Self, the truth of this universe, and the second section idam idam signifies the unstable state when one experiences the universe is false and unreal. The fourth energy called the pralayakala pramatri shakti makes one reside in the state of Suddhavidya.

Shaivism defines sristi ("Creation") as the act of the Supreme Lord making idam ('object') appear through self-manifestation in the background of akasha (void or space) created by self-limitation or self-negation. Here Idam signifies the Anatman which Idamta though not different from Ahamta is not eternal; the self-experience of Ahamta prevails over the self-experience of indistinct Idamta which disappears on attaining the stithi state – aham eva idam ("I am all this"). Idamta, a self-extension, aids in the realization of Paramshiva.

References

Hindu philosophical concepts
Yoga concepts
Vedanta
Shaivism
Sanskrit words and phrases
Vyakarana